Osmium is a chemical element with symbol Os and atomic number 76.

Osmium may also refer to:

 Osmium (album), the debut album of American funk band Parliament
 Osmium weapons, a type of weapon material found in the online videogame Cabal Online

See also

 Isotopes of osmium